Josef Röhrig (28 February 1925 – 12 February 2014) was a German footballer who played as a midfielder.

Club career 
Röhrig was born in Zündorf, a Cologne suburb, and played after the World War II for the then newly founded 1. FC Köln for a decade. He was part of the team which reached the 1954 final of the DFB-Pokal and the 1960 decider for the West German football championship but lost on both occasions.

International career 
Röhrig also made sporadic appearances for the West Germany national football team between 1950 and 1956, playing 12 times and scoring two goals.

Honours
 DFB-Pokal runner-up, 1954
 German football championship runner-up, 1960

References

External links
 
 
 
 

1925 births
2014 deaths
Footballers from Cologne
1. FC Köln players
German footballers
Association football midfielders
Germany international footballers
West German footballers